Lawrence Dennis (December 25, 1893 – August 20, 1977) was a mixed-race American diplomat, consultant and author. He advocated fascism in America after the Great Depression, arguing that liberal capitalism was doomed and one-party planning of the economy was essential.

Early life

Dennis was born in Atlanta, Georgia. He was of mixed race, but he concealed that as a teenager and instead passed as a white man until his death—even his wife and daughters did not know. Following a notable career as a child evangelist, he was sent to Phillips Exeter Academy and then to Harvard University.

During World War I, Dennis commanded a company of military police in France. He graduated from Harvard in 1920 and entered the foreign service.

The turning point of his life came when he served in Nicaragua. He resigned from the foreign service in disgust at the US intervention there against Sandino's rebellion. He then became an adviser to the Latin American fund of the Seligman banking trust, but he again made enemies when he wrote a series of exposés of their foreign bond enterprises in The New Republic and The Nation in 1930. The exposés propelled Dennis into a national public intellectual career, publishing his first book at the height of the depression in 1932, Is Capitalism Doomed? The book submitted that capitalism was and should be on its death knell, but it warned of the grave dangers of a world devoid of its positive legacy.

Fascist supporter
In 1941, Life called Dennis "America's No. 1 intellectual Fascist." His two later books detailed his sense of the system that was emerging to replace capitalism, which he believed to be fascism. The Coming American Fascism in 1936, detailing the system's substructure, and The Dynamics of War and Revolution in 1940, on the superstructure. Dennis argued that he was merely examining fascism and predicting its coming to the U.S., not actually advocating it. His readers and associates assumed he was indeed an advocate.  He never tried to create or join a fascist party.

Dennis was an editor at The Awakener for some time. Later, he founded his own publication, the Weekly Foreign Letter, and he wrote for Today's Challenge, published by the pro-German American Fellowship Forum of George Sylvester Viereck and Friedrich Ernst Ferdinand Auhagen (b. 1899). He tried to join the US Army during World War II, but the Army rejected him after the media ran stories about him.

Sedition trial
In 1944, he was indicted in a group that ranged from isolationists to pro-Nazi agitators, in a sedition prosecution under the Smith Act.  After seven months of proceedings the case ended in a mistrial, after presiding judge Edward C. Eicher died of a heart attack in November 1944. Dennis co-authored with Maximilian John St. George (1885–1959) an account of the trial, which appeared in 1946 as A Trial on Trial: The Great Sedition Trial of 1944.

Later life
In his later years, Dennis repudiated his views of the 1930s and early 1940s, became a critic of militarism and the Cold War, and he propagated his views through a modest newsletter, The Appeal to Reason (not to be confused with the similar named Appeal to Reason, a left-wing newspaper published in the American Midwest from 1895 until 1922), which maintained a prominent circle of readers, including Herbert Hoover, Joseph P. Kennedy, William Appleman Williams, Harry Elmer Barnes, and James J. Martin. His last book, Operational Thinking for Survival, was published in 1969.

Alec Marsh suggests that, "Dennis will find his place in the disenchanted anti-liberal black company of Thomas Sowell, Clarence Thomas, and George Schuyler.

Books
 Is Capitalism Doomed? (Harper & Brothers, 1932)
 The Coming American Fascism (Harper & Brothers, 1936) online
 The Dynamics of War and Revolution (Harper & Brothers, 1940)
 A Trial on Trial: The Great Sedition Trial of 1944 (1946)
 Operational Thinking for Survival (Ralph Myles, 1969)

References

Further reading
 Justus D. Doenecke, "The Isolationist as Collectivist: Lawrence Dennis and The Coming of World War II" Journal of Libertarian Studies 3 (Summer 1979): 191–208.
 Justus D. Doenecke, "Lawrence Dennis: Revisionist of the Cold War," Wisconsin Magazine of History 55 (Summer 1972): 275–86.
 Justus D. Doenecke, "Weekly Foreign Letter, 1938–1942," in Ronald Lora and William Henry Longton, eds. The Conservative Press in Twentieth-Century America (1999, 287–294.
 Justus D. Doenecke, "Appeal to Reason, 1946–1972" in ibid., 295–303.
 Gerald Horne, The Color of Fascism: Lawrence Dennis, Racial Passing, and the Rise of Right-Wing Extremism in the United States (New York University Press, 2006)
  Stuart E. Knee. "Prophet of Darkness" New England Journal of History (1995) 51#3 pp 37–43.
 Alec Marsh. “Lawrence Dennis: Black Voice in the Right Wing Wilderness.” Callaloo 31#4 (2008), pp. 1362–70, online.
 Ronald Radosh, Prophets on the Right: Profiles of Conservative Critics of American Globalism (1975)

External links

"The Color of Fascism: Lawrence Dennis, Racial Passing, and the Rise of Right-Wing Extremism in the United States", New York University Press webpage for the book by Gerald Horne
"Tales of a Seditionist: The Lawrence Dennis Story" by Justin Raimondo, antiwar.com, April 28, 2000

1893 births
1977 deaths
Writers from Atlanta
20th-century American economists
Phillips Exeter Academy alumni
Harvard University alumni
American fascists
American anti-war activists